Wendel is a given name and surname. Notable people with the name include:

Surname 
 Ben Wendel (born 1976), American musician
 Elmarie Wendel (born 1939), American actress
 Johnathan Wendel (born 1981), professional gamer also known as Fatal1ty
 Joseph Wendel (1901–1960), archbishop of the diocese of Munich and Freising

Given name 
 Wendel Clark (born 1966), ice hockey player
 Wendela Hebbe (1808–1899), Swedish journalist
 Wendel Meldrum (1954–2021), Canadian actress
 Wendel (footballer, born 1981), full name Wendel Santana Pereira Santos, Brazilian football defensive midfielder and wingback
 Wendel (footballer, born 1982), full name Wendel Geraldo Maurício e Silva, Brazilian football midfielder
 Wendel (footballer, born 1984), full name Wendel Raul Gonçalves Gomes, Brazilian football defensive midfielder
 Wendel (footballer, born 1991), full name Wendel Alex dos Santos, Brazilian football attacking midfielder
 Wendel (footballer, born 1997), full name Marcus Wendel Valle da Silva, Brazilian football midfielder
 Wendel (footballer, born 2000), full name Wendel da Silva Costa, Brazilian football forward

See also
 Wendel (Swedish family), a Swedish noble family
 de Wendel family, a family of industrialists from Lorraine, France
 Wendl, surname
 Wendell (name)
 Wendle, surname